The Tal Afar Citadel is a citadel located in Tal Afar, a city in Nineveh Governorate in northwest Iraq. The citadel was built by the Ottoman Empire, although it contains remains dating back to the Assyrian period.

Following the 2003 invasion of Iraq, the citadel housed the mayoral, municipal and police headquarters of Tal Afar. It was used as a base by American forces in the Battle of Tal Afar in 2005. Tal Afar fell to the Islamic State of Iraq and the Levant in June 2014, and the militants used the citadel as a prison for women and girls who were to be forcibly married to ISIL members.

In December 2014, ISIL blew up the city's northern and western walls, causing extensive damage. The militants also excavated some of the ruins within the citadel, probably to look for antiquities which they could sell. UNESCO Director-General Irina Bokova strongly condemned the destruction of the citadel. The citadel was recaptured by Iraqi forces during the battle to recapture Tal Afar in 2017.

References

Castles in Iraq
Prisons in Iraq
Ottoman fortifications
Buildings and structures destroyed by ISIL